Murrays Bridge is a rural locality in the Southern Downs Region, Queensland, Australia. In the  Murrays Bridge had a population of 103 people.

Geography 
Murrays Bridge is flat land (about 500 metres above sea level), entirely freehold and used for agriculture, principally grazing but also some cropping near the river. The Condamine River flows through the locality from south-east to the north-west. The Warwick-Killarney Road passes through the locality from the north-east to the north-west.

History 
Murray's Bridge State School opened on 1 June 1937. On 2 May 1987 the school celebrated 50 years of schooling by the unveiling of a monument by the school's first teacher Janet Smith (née Turnbull).

In the  Murrays Bridge had a population of 103 people.

Education 
Murray's Bridge State School is a government primary (Prep-6) school for boys and girls at 1378 Killarney Road.
In 2016, the school had an enrolment of 12 students with 2 teachers and 5 non-teaching staff (2 full-time equivalent).
In 2018, the school had an enrolment of 12 students with 2 teachers and 7 non-teaching staff (2 full-time equivalent).

References

Further reading 
 

Southern Downs Region
Localities in Queensland